The Wagner–Rogers Bill was proposed United States legislation which would have increased the quota of immigrants by bringing a total of 20,000 Jewish children (there were no sectarian criteria) under the age of 14 (10,000 in 1939, and another 10,000 in 1940) to the United States from Nazi Germany.  

The bill was sponsored by Senator Robert F. Wagner (D-N.Y.) and Rep. Edith Rogers (R-Mass.) in the wake of the 1938 Kristallnacht attacks on Jews in Germany. The bill was introduced to Congress on February 9, 1939.

The bill had widespread support among religious and labor groups, but was opposed by nationalist organizations and Senator Robert Rice Reynolds threatened to filibuster against it. President Franklin D. Roosevelt supported the bill, but believed that he lacked the wherewithal to overcome congressional resistance. His wife, Eleanor Roosevelt, also expressed support for the bill.

A poll by the American Friends Service Committee found that thirty-five senators were "in favor" of the bill and thirty-four "probably in favor". These votes may have sufficed for the bill to pass, but a filibuster would have likely caused problems. Nevertheless, the House Immigration Committee never reported the bill out; eleven members were said to be opposed and eight in favor. Historian Richard Breitman argues that, in addition to general anti-immigration sentiment, anti-semitism also played a substantial role in the bill's defeat.

References

External links
Marion E. Kenworthy (1891-1980) Papers at the American Jewish Historical Society, New York, NY

United States proposed federal immigration and nationality legislation
International response to the Holocaust
Antisemitism in the United States
1939 in Judaism